The Kreutzer Sonata is a 1927 Czech silent drama film directed by Gustav Machatý. It is based on the 1889 novella of the same name by Leo Tolstoy. The film's art direction was by Vilém Rittershain.

Cast
 Eva Byronová as Nataša Pozdnyševová  
 Jan W. Speerger as Pozdnyšev  
 Miroslav Paul as Truchačevský  
 Božena Svobodová as Nataša's Mother
 Saša Dobrovolná as Nanny 
 Alfred Schlesinger as Physician
 Václav Žichovský as Concert attendant
 Rudolf Stahl as Nataša's dancing partner
 Ladislav Desenský as Concert attendant
 Máňa Ženíšková as Young Girl in the Concert

References

External links

1927 films
Films directed by Gustav Machatý
Czech silent films
Films based on The Kreutzer Sonata
Czech black-and-white films
Czech drama films
1927 drama films
Silent drama films
1920s Czech-language films